Rebecca Gethings is an English actress best known for her roles in film and television comedies such as The Thick of It, Extras, The Mimic, David Brent: Life on the Road and Call the Midwife.

Career

Television
Gethings has collaborated several times with Armando Iannucci, improvising with the US cast of Veep, in which she also appears. Iannucci later cast her as Helen Hatley, the ambitious special adviser to Nicola Murray in the fourth and final series of The Thick of It. 
Gethings played Lizzie in episode 4 of 'Extras', directed by Ricky Gervais and Stephen Merchant.
In March 2020, she appeared in an episode of the BBC soap opera Doctors as Fran Claverley.

Gethings will portray Sister Veronica in BBC period drama Call the Midwife from series 12 onwards.

Voice work
Gethings has voiced a number of animated characters for children's television, advertising campaigns and documentaries. and was the voice of Maiya the Meerkat in the Compare The Market TV advertising campaign.

Film
She worked again with Ricky Gervais, playing Miriam, the head of Human Resources in David Brent: Life on the Road, released in August 2016. Her film work also includes Casino Royale and Mad to Be Normal.

Theatre
Gethings' stage work includes Chicken Soup with Barley at the Royal Court Theatre and the West End theatre production of Maxim Gorky's Vassa.

Personal life
Gethings' long time partner is the Emmy award-winning animation director Tom Brass. They have two children.

Filmography

References

External links
 
 Official website

English television actresses
English stage actresses
English film actresses
Living people
People educated at St. George's School, Ascot
21st-century English actresses
English voice actresses
Year of birth missing (living people)